The North Florida Ospreys baseball team represents the University of North Florida in the sport of baseball. The Ospreys compete in Division I of the National Collegiate Athletics Association (NCAA), in the ASUN Conference (A-Sun). They play their home games in Harmon Stadium on the university's Jacksonville, Florida campus, and are currently led by head coach Tim Parenton. The Ospreys were founded in 1988 as members of the NAIA. They moved to the NCAA Division II level in 1994, and began their Division I transition in 2006. They became fully eligible at the Division I level in 2010.  Most recently, the Ospreys won their first Atlantic Sun regular season championship in 2015.

History

North Florida's baseball program was founded in 1988. The team was established under the leadership of Dusty Rhodes, who served as head coach from 1988 to 2010. Since its inception, the Ospreys baseball team has won 13 conference titles: six in the NAIA, six in NCAA Division II, and one in NCAA Division I and has made a total of 16 playoff appearances: six in the NAIA and ten in NCAA Division II. They went to the NAIA World Series in 1989 and 1991 and the NCAA Division II World Series in 2000, 2001, and 2005, advancing to the final in 2005.

Notably, the team's former logo is similar to the New York Yankees logo. It was designed in 1986 at the urging of Dusty Rhodes and continued, and brought extra attention to the baseball program. It was discontinued after Rhodes' retirement in 2010 and replaced with a new logo for the 2011 season.

The team's current head coach is Tim Parenton, who replaced Smoke Laval at the end of the 2017 season. The Ospreys won their first Atlantic Sun regular season championship in 2015.  Star outfielder Donnie Dewees, a redshirt sophomore, was named Atlantic Sun Player of the Year and Laval was the conference's Coach of the Year.  Dewees led the nation in runs (81), runs per game (1.51), hits (101) and total bases (178) at the conclusion of the regular season and posted a 31-game hit streak.  Dewees was also named one of 21 semifinalists for the Golden Spikes Award.  The Chicago Cubs selected Dewees in the second round, with the 47th overall selection, of the draft.  He was UNF's highest-drafted player since they transitioned to Division I in 2005.

Facilities
The Ospreys play their home games on campus at Harmon Stadium. It was built in 1988 and has a capacity of 1,000 fans. The playing field and batting facility are named for former Ospreys baseball coach Dusty Rhodes.

Head coaches

Year-by-year results

Conference championships

Awards

Conference awards
Atlantic Sun Conference Coach of the Year
 Smoke Laval (2015)
Atlantic Sun Conference Player of the Year
 Donnie Dewees (2015)

References

External links 
 

 
Baseball teams established in 1988
1988 establishments in Florida